The 1907 Manitoba general election was held on March 7, 1907 to elect members of the Legislative Assembly of the Province of Manitoba, Canada.

The result was a third consecutive majority government for the Conservative Party of Manitoba, led by premier Rodmond Roblin. Roblin's electoral machine won 28 seats, against 13 for the opposition Manitoba Liberal Party under new leader Edward Brown.

Results

Constituency results

Arthur:
John Williams (L) 536
Amos Lyle (C) 533

Assiniboia:
Aime Benard (C) 550
(incumbent)Joseph H. Prefontaine (L) 311

Avondale:
(incumbent)James Argue (C) 590   
W.H.B. Hill (L) 451

Beautiful Plains:
(incumbent)James H. Howden (C) 791
Alexander Dunlop (L) 679

Birtle:
(incumbent)Charles Mickle (L) 617
Thomas Thompson (C) 380

Brandon City:
(incumbent)Stanley McInnis (C) 1210
J.W. Fleming (L) 1081

Carillon:
(incumbent)Albert Prefontaine (C) 423   
Mastai Gervais (L) 318

Cypress:
(incumbent)George Steel (C) 783
Adam Forbes (L) 672

Dauphin:
John A. Campbell (L) 830
James G. Harvey (C) 709

Deloraine:
Robert Thornton (L) 602
(incumbent)Edward Briggs (C) 561

Dufferin:
(incumbent)Rodmond Roblin (C) 931
Edward August (L) 760

Emerson:
George Walton (L) 582
(incumbent)David H. McFadden (C) 477

Gilbert Plains:
(incumbent)Glenlyon Campbell (C) accl.

Gimli:
Sigtryggur Jonasson (L) 621
(incumbent)Baldwin Baldwinson (C) 465

Gladstone:
James Armstrong (L) 743
(incumbent)David Wilson (C) 682

Hamiota:
William Ferguson (C) 737
M.B. Jackson (L) 636

Kildonan and St. Andrews:
Orton Grain (C) 792
(incumbent)Martin O'Donohoe (L) 751

Killarney:
(incumbent)George Lawrence (C) 642
R.L. Richardson (L) 486

Lakeside:
(incumbent)Edwin Lynch (C) 460
Peter McArthur (L) 433

Lansdowne:
Tobias Norris (L) 859
(incumbent)Harvey E. Hicks (C) 763

La Verendrye:
Jean Lauzon (C) 361
(incumbent)William Lagimodiere (L) 338

Manitou:
(incumbent)Robert Rogers (C) 832
G.E. Davidson (L) 512

Minnedosa:
(incumbent)William B. Waddell (C) 792
E.W. Pearson (L) 626

Morden:
Benjamin McConnell (L) 544
(incumbent)George Ashdown (C) 454

Morris:
(incumbent)Colin H. Campbell (C) 525
John Molloy (L) 524

Mountain:
James Baird (L) 1031
(incumbent)Daniel A. McIntyre (C) 598

Norfolk:
(incumbent)Robert Lyons (C) 799
William Walker (L) 646

Portage la Prairie:
(incumbent)Hugh Armstrong (C) 868
Edward Brown (L) 645

Rhineland:
(incumbent)Valentine Winkler (L) 364
Cor. Bergman (C) 321

Rockwood:
(incumbent)Isaac Riley (C) 676
Ira Stratton (L) 620

Russell:
Angus Bonnycastle (C) 605
T.A. Wright (L) 596

St. Boniface:
Joseph Bernier (C) 749
(incumbent)Horace Chevrier (L) 688

South Brandon:
(incumbent)Alfred Carroll (C) 418
James Roddick (L) 409

Springfield:
Donald Ross (L) 540
John Little (C) 359

Swan River:
(incumbent)James Robson (C) 387
J.P. Jones (L) 348

Turtle Mountain:
(incumbent)James Johnson (C) 649
John Morrow (L) 462

Virden:
(incumbent)John Agnew (C) 730
John Rattray (L) 645

Winnipeg Centre:
(incumbent)Thomas Taylor (C) 2314
J.A MacArthur (L) 2047

Winnipeg North:
John F. Mitchell (C) 2244
Alex. MacDonald (L) 1874

Winnipeg South:
(incumbent)James Gordon (C) 2122
Benjamin Elswood Chaffey (L) 1988

Winnipeg West:
Thomas Herman Johnson (L) 2011
Thomas Sharpe (C) 1785
Kempton McKim (ILP) 939

Post-election changes

Beautiful Plains (James H. Howden appointed to cabinet, March 16, 1907), March 26, 1907:
James H. Howden (C) accl.

Brandon City (Stanley McInnis appointed to cabinet, June 26, 1907), July 16, 1907:
Stanley McInnis (C) accl.

Brandon City (dec. Stanley McInnis, November 4, 1907), November 25, 1907:
George Coldwell (C) accl.

Gilbert Plains (res. Glenlyon Campbell, 1908), November 17, 1908:
Duncan Cameron (C) 894
A.D. Cummings (L) 855

Portage la Prairie (Hugh Armstrong to cabinet, November 19, 1908), November 30, 1908:
Hugh Armstrong (C) accl.

Virden (dec. John Agnew, November 9, 1908), January 9, 1909:
Harvey Simpson (C) +206
Robert Forke (L)

Birtle (res. Charles Mickle, 1909), November 27, 1909:
George Malcolm (L/Grain Grower's) elected

References

Further reading
 

1907
1907 elections in Canada
1907 in Manitoba
March 1907 events